Robert Milton (January 24, 1885 – January 13, 1956) was a Russian-born screenwriter and film director who worked and settled in the United States. He wrote and directed for the stage, and directed three British films.

Selected theatre credits

Filmography

Director

Screenwriter

References

Bibliography
 Goble, Alan. The Complete Index to Literary Sources in Film. Walter de Gruyter, 1999.

External links

1885 births
1956 deaths
Russian film directors
Emigrants from the Russian Empire to the United States
20th-century Russian screenwriters
Male screenwriters
20th-century Russian male writers